Senator Colby may refer to:

Everett Colby (1874–1943), New Jersey State Senate
Leonard Wright Colby (1846–1924), Ohio State Senate